James Thomas McDermott (February 13, 1872 – February 7, 1938) of Chicago was a Democratic U.S. Representative from Illinois's 4th congressional district, 1907–14, 1915–17.

He was born and raised in Grand Rapids, Michigan, where he attended a Catholic High School. He later moved to Detroit. He was a telegraph operator there for about four years. In 1889 he moved to Chicago where he become a tobacco retailer.

References

External links

1872 births
1938 deaths
Politicians from Grand Rapids, Michigan
Politicians from Chicago
Democratic Party members of the United States House of Representatives from Illinois